W. Ford Doolittle  (born February 21, 1942, in Urbana, Illinois) is an evolutionary and molecular biologist. He is a member of the US National Academy of Sciences and a Fellow of the Royal Society of Canada and the Norwegian Academy of Science and Letters. He is also the winner of the 2013 Herzberg Medal of the Natural Sciences and Engineering Research Council of Canada and the 2017 Killam Prize.

Doolittle has made significant contributions to the study of cyanobacteria. He found evidence for the endosymbiont origins of chloroplasts, and developed a theoretical basis for the initial evolution of eukaryotes. He has shown the importance of horizontal gene transfer in prokaryotic evolution.

, he has been Professor Emeritus at Dalhousie University in Halifax, Nova Scotia.  He received his BA in Biochemical Sciences from Harvard University in 1963 and his PhD from Stanford University in 1967, under Charles Yanofsky. He went on to do postdoctoral fellowships with Sol Spiegelman and Norman R. Pace.

In 1981, Doolittle received some level of notoriety for his article in The CoEvolution Quarterly entitled "Is Nature Really Motherly?".  This was a sharp rebuttal of J. E. Lovelock's formulation of the Gaia Theory. Doolittle's article is often cited by Lovelock's critics.

Because of his philosophical musings on the non-existence of an all-encompassing Tree of life, Doolittle has occasionally been cited on Intelligent Design blogs. However, though Doolittle argues that a bifurcating tree is not an adequate metaphor for the evolution of life on earth, he is not a supporter of Intelligent Design. A single common ancestor and tree relating all of life on earth is not a necessary component of the theory of descent with modification, the essence of evolution.

Doolittle is currently involved in a debate about the proper use of function (biology) within evolutionary biology sparked by controversy over the results of the ENCODE consortium stating that 80% of the genome is "functional". He is a supporter of the concept of junk DNA.

In addition to his contributions to evolutionary biology, Doolittle is an artist who studied at NSCAD University, achieving a BA in photography.

References

External links 
 Personal homepage at Dalhousie University
 
 
 
 
 W.F.Doolittle on Google Scholar
 Taking an axe to the Tree of Life, an article describing Doolittle's views on updating Darwin's theory.

1941 births
Living people
Harvard University alumni
Members of the Norwegian Academy of Science and Letters
NSCAD University alumni
Members of the United States National Academy of Sciences
American biochemists
Fellows of the Royal Society of Canada
People from Urbana, Illinois
Academic staff of the Dalhousie University